Special Effects: Anything Can Happen is an American documentary film directed by Academy Award-winning sound designer Ben Burtt and narrated by John Lithgow. It was released to IMAX theaters in 1996.

Overview
This documentary film is an exploration of special effects techniques used in motion pictures, including traditional special effects up to modern computer generated effects. It is also notable for featuring the making of the new digital effects created for the special edition version of Star Wars Episode IV: A New Hope, which was released to theaters one year later in 1997.

The film was nominated for an Academy Award for Best Documentary Short Subject, but lost to Breathing Lessons.

References

External links
 
 
 Official website

Special effects
1996 films
American documentary films
IMAX short films
Documentary films about the film industry
Films directed by Ben Burtt
IMAX documentary films
1990s English-language films
1990s American films